Sunrise Lake is a lake on Vancouver Island north of Mount Albert Edward near the head of the Oyster River, in Strathcona Provincial Park.

References

Alberni Valley
Lakes of Vancouver Island
Comox Land District